Lara Ann Estroff is an American materials scientist who is a professor at Cornell University. Her research considers the study and design of biomaterials.

Early life and education 
Estroff was an undergraduate student at Swarthmore College, where she majored in chemistry and anthropology. As a college student, she played soccer. Estroff then worked at the Weizmann Institute of Science, alongside Lia Addadi, where she started investigating biomineralization and how chemical approaches could be used to solve challenges in archaeology. Estroff returned to the United States for doctoral research, joining the laboratory of Andrew D. Hamilton where she worked on the synthesis of organic superstructures that were inspired by biology. These molecules can be used to control the growth of inorganic crystals. Estroff moved to Harvard University as an National Institutes of Health postdoctoral fellow with George M. Whitesides.

Research and career 
In 2005, Estroff joined Cornell University, where she was made professor in 2019. Estroff studies biomaterials and the growth of crystals. She is particularly interested in the process of biomineralization. Estroff studies micro-calcification: small, calcium-laced deposits that are associated with the formation of some cancers, including breast tumors. She creates spatially resolved images of the composition of calcifications using tissue biopsies to better understand the chemistry within the local environment when the biocrystals started to grow.

Estroff was appointed faculty advisor for the "Women in Materials Science and Engineering" program at Cornell in 2007. She was elected Chair of the Materials Science and Engineering at Cornell in 2020.

Awards and honors 
 2006 Empire State Development's Division of Science, Technology and Innovation J.D. Watson Young Investigator Award 
 2009 NSF Early Faculty Career Award

Selected publications

References 

Cornell University faculty
Swarthmore College alumni
Yale University alumni
Living people
American materials scientists
21st-century American women scientists
Year of birth missing (living people)